Aaron Linsdau (born 1973) is an American adventurer living in Jackson, Wyoming.  He is known for the longest solo expedition from Hercules Inlet to the South Pole, his book Antarctic Tears, his winter trek across the Greenland tundra, and his three ski expeditions across Yellowstone National Park in winter.

Early life and education
Linsdau was born 1973 in Jackson, Wyoming. Linsdau grew up in San Ysidro.  He is an Eagle Scout.

Career

In 2013 Linsdau traveled alone to the South Pole on skis. He took along 70 pounds of butter for energy, but it turned rancid from exposure to the sun in the last two weeks. Illness delayed him, and his trip to the pole took 80 days.

Linsdau speaks professionally about his experiences, teaching audiences how to build resilience to overcome adversity in the most trying conditions.

Books
Adventure Expedition One, co-authored with Dr. Terry M. Williams, is a how-to manual for first-time explorers and adventurers. The objective of the guide is to teach safe preparation and travel techniques for expeditions.

In Antarctic Tears, Linsdau recounts a solo unsupported journey to and back the South Pole. On November 1, 2012, Aaron Linsdau set out to ski unsupported to the South Pole and back from Hercules Inlet.

In Lost at Windy Corner, Aaron Linsdau attempted a solo climb of Denali (Mt. McKinley) in 2016. He documented the experience of what climbing one of the seven summits alone was like.

Linsdau wrote a series of guidebooks for the Solar eclipse of August 21, 2017 crossing the United States. The guides focus on the following states and locations: Jackson Hole, Oregon, Idaho, Wyoming, Nebraska, Illinois, Missouri, Kentucky, Tennessee, North Carolina, South Carolina.

Linsdau is publishing the series of guidebooks for the Solar eclipse of April 8, 2024 crossing the United States from Texas to Maine.

Documentary
A documentary about Linsdau's expedition was released titled Antarctic Tears - Determination, Adversity, and the Pursuit of a Dream at the Bottom of the World.

Works

Awards
National Eagle Scout Association Outstanding Eagle Scout Award

Further reading

References 

Living people
People from Jackson, Wyoming
American non-fiction writers
Writers from Wyoming
People of Antarctica
1973 births